José Ricardo Pérez Morales (born 24 October 1963) is a Colombian football defender who played for Colombia in the 1990 FIFA World Cup. He also played for Once Caldas and Atlético Nacional. Currently, he is coaching Colombian club Boyacá Chicó.

References

External links

Colombia - Record International Players at rsssf

1963 births
Living people
Colombian footballers
Colombia international footballers
1990 FIFA World Cup players
Association football defenders
Once Caldas footballers
Atlético Junior footballers
Atlético Nacional footballers
Independiente Santa Fe footballers
Independiente Medellín footballers
Categoría Primera A players
Colombian football managers
People from Manizales
Boyacá Chicó managers